Redd is the debut extended play by South Korean singer and Mamamoo member Wheein. It was released on April 13, 2021, through RBW and consists of seven tracks, including the lead single "Water Color". Wheein stated that the meaning of the album is "'to tidy up' and 'to get rid of' meaning to get out of false tastes and paint...honest colors."

Background and release
On March 26, 2021, RBW confirmed that Wheein would be making her solo comeback, marking over a year since her last solo promotions with Solar and the title song "Goodbye" in September 2019. On March 28, Wheein released a teaser video for her upcoming solo album with the caption ‘Coming Soon’. On April 2 at midnight KST, the first promotional concept photo was released with the name of the name of the album revealed as Redd and the official release date April 13. The same day, a teaser schedule was released. On April 6, Wheein released a second concept photo and concept film for Redd. On April 6, the track list was revealed to contain seven songs with “Water Color” serving as the title track. On April 7, a third concept photo was posted on the official Mamamoo SNS. On April 8, a teaser for the official music video was released on the official Mamamoo YouTube channel, along with sneak peeks of the other songs on the mini album. On April 9, a fourth concept photo was released. On April 10, a fifth concept photo was released. On April 12, a second music video teaser was released for “Water Color”.

Track listing

Charts

EP

Other charted songs

Release history

References

2021 EPs
Korean-language EPs